John Walker (1854 – unknown) was an English first-class cricketer active 1874–81 who played for Middlesex. He was born in Harrow.

References

1854 births
English cricketers
Middlesex cricketers
Year of death missing
Cricketers from Greater London